Expedition 38 was the 38th expedition to the International Space Station.

Crew

Sources
JAXA, NASA, ESA

References

External links

NASA's Space Station Expeditions page

Expeditions to the International Space Station
2013 in spaceflight
2014 in spaceflight